Anthology is the second live album by Thrice, recorded during the band's farewell tour in May and June 2012. The album was released on October 30, 2012 on two CDs, and as a quadruple 180 gram LP box set limited to 3000 copies. The album consists of 24 of the 25 most-played songs on the tour, and features tracks from 2001's Identity Crisis through 2011's Major/Minor.

The cover art for the album is an old map of the highways and major streets from the band's home region of Orange County, CA including parts of Irvine, North Tustin, Orange, Santa Ana, and Tustin.

Track listing

References

Thrice albums
2012 live albums